Seterstøa Station is a railway station located in Seterstøa in Nes, Norway on the Kongsvinger Line. The station was built in 1862 as part of the Kongsvinger Line. The station was served five times daily by Oslo Commuter Rail line 460 operated by Norwegian State Railways until it was closed down in December 2012.

Railway stations in Nes, Akershus
Railway stations on the Kongsvinger Line
Railway stations opened in 1862
1862 establishments in Norway